Warren G. Harding High School is a public high school in Warren, Ohio, United States. It is the only high school in the Warren City School District. Sports teams are called the Raiders, and they compete in the Ohio High School Athletic Association as a member of the All-American Conference.

Athletics
Athletic programs include football, baseball, fastpitch, basketball (men's and women's), soccer (men's and women's), bowling, swimming and diving, volleyball, golf, tennis, track and field, and cheerleading, with talks of forming a lacrosse team.

OHSAA State Championships

 Baseball – 1933 
 Football – 1972*, 1974, 1990 
 Track and Field – 2010
 *Titles won by Warren Western Reserve High School prior to consolidation in 1990.

Notable alumni
Warren High Schools' Distinguished Alumni Hall of Fame was launched in 1993. 145 distinguished alumni include:

 Roger Ailes – president and CEO of Fox News Network
 David Arnold – former NFL player
 Lynn Bowden – Kentucky quarterback and receiver, consensus All-American
 Aaron Brown – former NFL player
 Keith Browner – former NFL player
 Jim Browner – former NFL player
 Ross Browner – Cincinnati Bengals defensive end, star defensive end at University of Notre Dame 1973–77, Outland Trophy winner 1976, first-round NFL draft pick 1978
 Prescott Burgess – Michigan, Baltimore Ravens linebacker
 Michael Capellas – current CEO of WorldCom
 Joe Carroll – former NFL player
 John Chickerneo – former NFL player
 Maurice Clarett – Ohio State running back, Big Ten Freshman of the Year, public speaker
 James Daniels - Pittsburgh Steelers offensive lineman
 LeShun Daniels – former NFL player
 Earl Derr Biggers – creator of Charlie Chan
 David L. Gray - American Catholic theologian, author, speaker, and radio show host
 Daniel Herron – Ohio State, Indianapolis Colts running back
 David Herron – Kansas City Chiefs linebacker
 Sean Jones – musician, lead trumpeter for Jazz at Lincoln Center Orchestra, composer
 Bill Kollar – former NFL player
 Mario Manningham – Michigan, San Francisco 49ers, New York Giants wide receiver, Super Bowl XLVI champion
 John Ness Beck – composer of religious music
 Ronald Parise – former astronaut
 Kenneth Patchen – poet
 Chris Rucker – former NFL player
 Korey Stringer – former Minnesota Vikings right tackle, first-round pick in the 1995 NFL Draft, Minnesota Vikings Ring of Honor
 Ed Stroud – Major League Baseball player (1966–1971)
 Harriet Taylor Upton – leader in women's suffrage movement
 Paul Warfield – wide receiver in the Pro Football Hall of Fame played for the Cleveland Browns and Miami Dolphins of the NFL
 Bill White – former MLB player (New York Giants, St. Louis Cardinals, Philadelphia Phillies), New York Yankees broadcaster and National League president

Other extracurricular programs

Warren Student Communication Network
The school's broadcasting class. Each day the class put together a show of the days announcements. To be in WSCN, students must pass a Beginning Broadcasting class and obtain permission from the teacher. Students also produce music videos, PTVs, Public Service Announcements, and several other projects which are broadcast on the school's television station, and other local television channels.

Computer Graphics
The school's Computer Graphics program offers students the chance to design computer graphics.

Marching Band
The Warren G. Harding "Raider" marching band is the school's band. They participated in the 2004 Macy's Thanksgiving Day Parade. The band was also invited to play in the 65th Pearl Harbor anniversary in Hawaii. The band also received the honor of being invited to play at the 2008 Summer Olympics in Beijing. The "Raider Band" was also invited to march in the national memorial day parade in 2009, and did so in late May 2010. They also participated in the Pittsburgh Celebrate the Season parade in 2007 and 2009. The 2013-14 "Raider Band" participated in the 2014 National Tartan Day Parade in New York City, in which they were the only high school marching band and the largest performing group. In March 2016 the band participated in Chicago's St. Patrick's Day parade. In the Spring of 2018, the band traveled to Virginia to participate in the 75th annual Apple Blossom Parade.

Choir
There are various types of choirs at Harding, including the madrigals and new tomorrows where the students dance and sing on stage. Traditional groups include the a cappella choir, the concert choir, and the freshman chorale.

FIRST Robotics
Warren G. Harding Team E.L.I.T.E. 48 (Encouraging Learning In Technology and Engineering) is a FIRST Robotics Competition team. Each year FIRST creates a new game/challenge, and every team has six weeks to design and manufacture a robot to complete the given tasks.

Quizbowl/Academic team 
The Warren G. Harding quizbowl team is regularly ranked within the top 100 of the nation. In 2012 the team won the school's first state championship in the activity, led by senior Michael Coates.

References

External links
 School website
 wscn website
 WGHRAIDERS Website

High schools in Trumbull County, Ohio
Public high schools in Ohio
Warren, Ohio
1926 establishments in Ohio
Educational institutions established in 1926